Jonas Bento de Carvalho (born 22 July 1943) is a Brazilian former footballer.

References

1943 births
Living people
Association football midfielders
Brazilian footballers
Santos FC players
Footballers at the 1960 Summer Olympics
Olympic footballers of Brazil